Rosario Granados (March 12, 1925 – March 25, 1997) was an Argentine-born Mexican film actress known for her roles in Mexican cinema. Granados starred in the 1949 comedy The Great Madcap (1949).

Selected filmography
 The House of the Millions (1942)
 Adultery (1945)
 The Kneeling Goddess (1947)
 La casa de la Troya (1948)
 The Great Madcap (1949)
 Immaculate (1950)
 A Woman Without Love (1952)
 The Sixth Race (1953)
 La Vida No Vale Nada (1955)

References

Bibliography
 Acevedo-Muñoz, Ernesto R. Buñuel and Mexico: The Crisis of National Cinema. University of California Press, 2003.

External links

1925 births
1997 deaths
Argentine film actresses
Argentine emigrants to Mexico
Mexican film actresses
People from Buenos Aires